is a passenger railway station located in the city of Tsuyama, Okayama Prefecture, Japan, operated by West Japan Railway Company (JR West).

Lines

Station layout
The station consists of one ground-level side platform serving a single bi-directional track. The station building dates form the opening of the station, and the station is unattended.

Adjacent stations

History
Chiwa Station opened as a provisional station on September 12, 1931. With the privatization of the Japan National Railways (JNR) on April 1, 1987, the station came under the aegis of the West Japan Railway Company.

Passenger statistics
In fiscal 2019, the station was used by an average of 6 passengers daily..

Surrounding area
 Okayama Prefectural Road/Tottori Prefectural Road No. 6 Tsuyama Chizu Hatto Line

See also
List of railway stations in Japan

References

External links

  Chiwa Station Official Site

Railway stations in Okayama Prefecture
Railway stations in Japan opened in 1931
Tsuyama